Umberto Masetti (4 May 1926 – 28 May 2006) was an Italian two-time World Champion Grand Prix motorcycle road racer. In 1950, he became the first Italian to win the 500cc World Championship.

Career
Masetti was born in Borgo delle Rose, in the province of Parma.

He debuted in the Grand Prix motorcycle World Championship in 1949 aboard a Moto Morini, in the 125cc class. In the same year he also raced a Benelli in the 250cc class and a Gilera in the 500cc class.

In 1950, Masetti won the Grands Prix of Belgium and the Netherlands and defeated Geoff Duke for the 500cc World Championship. In 1952, still with Gilera, he was again World Champion, again taking victories in Belgium and the Netherlands.

In 1953 he raced in the 250cc class for NSU, but an accident at Imola prevented him from taking part for much of the season. In 1954 Masetti was again in the 500cc class with Gilera. In 1955 he divided his time between the 250cc and 500cc classes, this time for the MV Agusta factory, with whom he raced for until 1958. That year, after an unsuccessful season in the 500cc class, he retired from motorcycle competition.

Masetti then lived in Maranello, where he died in 2006.

Motorcycle Grand Prix results 
1949 point system:

Points system from 1950 to 1968:

(key) (Races in italics indicate fastest lap)

References 

1926 births
2006 deaths
Sportspeople from the Province of Parma
Italian motorcycle racers
500cc World Championship riders
350cc World Championship riders
250cc World Championship riders
125cc World Championship riders
500cc World Riders' Champions